Hesepe is a railway station located in Hesepe, Germany. The station is located on the Oldenburg–Osnabrück railway and Delmenhorst–Hesepe railway. The train services are operated by NordWestBahn.

Train services
The station is served by the following services:

Local services  Osnabrück - Bramsche - Vechta - Delmenhorst - Bremen

References

Railway stations in Lower Saxony